The Squatter's Daughter is a 1910 Australian silent film based on the popular play by Bert Bailey and Edmund Duggan.

Synopsis
The plot concerns the rivalry between two neighboring sheep stations, Enderby and Waratah. This version includes the subplot about the bushranger Ben Hall which was not used when the play was adapted again in 1933.

Cast
 Olive Wilton as Violet Enderby
 Bert Bailey as Archie McPherson
 Edmund Duggan as Ben Hall
 J.H. Nunn as James Harrington
 Rutland Beckett as Dudley Harrington
 George Cross as Tom Bathurst
 George Mackenzie as Nick Harvey
 Temple Harrison as Nulla Nulla
 Edwin Campbell as Billy
 Eugenie Duggan

Production
Filming took place in June 1910 with cast from the acting company of theatre producer William Anderson at the Kings Theatre Melbourne, many of whom had just appeared in The Man from Outback, also by Bailey and Duggan. Theatre star Olive Wilton played the lead role, with Bailey and Duggan in support. One of her leading men, George Cross, later became a casting director for Cinesound Productions.

Shooting took place in Ivanhoe and other surrounding districts of Melbourne entirely outdoors, even interior scenes. "Under these circumstances brilliant sunshine was the main factor to be wooed", recalled Olive Wilton. "It seemed impossible to acquire sufficient light without a constant battle against high wind, which made these interior scenes a nightmare, with hair and clothes blowing in all directions."

However the fact it was a movie allowed the demonstration of scenes only discussed in the play, such as Nulla escaping the bushranger's cave. Other sequences praised by reviewers included the abduction of the squatter's daughter, the pursuit by Ben Hall and his gang, Ben Hall's last stand, the dash through the cataract, the farm house rope bridge, the waterfall, the shearing match, and a champion stock whip artist.

It was advertised as being the most expensive movie ever made in Australia to that date, but this is unlikely.

Reception
Screenings were often accompanied by a lecture.

The movie was a popular success at the box office, breaking records in Sydney and Melbourne, and enjoying long runs throughout the country. It achieved a cinema release in England, one of the first Australian films to do so. Bert Bailey and Ken G. Hall tried to track down a copy of the movie when Hall directed a version in 1933 but was unsuccessful. No known copies of it exist today, and it is considered a lost film.

The Perth Sunday Times called the film a "calamity in celluloid."

References

External links
 
 The Squatter's Daughter at Ausstage

1910s Australian films
1910 films
1910 Western (genre) films
1910 lost films
Australian black-and-white films
Australian films based on plays
Lost Australian films
Lost Western (genre) films
Silent Australian Western (genre) films
1910s English-language films